In business economics, risk financing is concerned with providing funds to cover the financial effect of unexpected losses experienced by a firm.
 
Traditional forms of finance include risk transfer, funded retention by way of reserves (often called self-insurance) and risk pooling.

Alternative risk finance is the use of products and solutions which have grown out of the convergence of the banking and insurance industry.  They include captive insurance companies and catastrophic bonds, and finite risk products such loss portfolio transfers and adverse development covers.  Professor Lawrence A. Cunningham of George Washington University suggests adapting cat bonds to the risks that large auditing firms face in cases asserting massive securities law damages.

References

Financial risk management